Gunnison Valley, is a valley that heads in Sanpete County, at  and whose mouth is in Sevier County, Utah.

The headwaters of Salina Creek have their origin here.

See also

 List of valleys of Utah

References

External links

Canyons and gorges of Utah